Jerzy Kozdroń (born 23 October 1950 in Mrągowo) is a Polish politician. He was elected to the Sejm on 15 September 2005, getting 3,868 votes in 25 Gdańsk district as a candidate from the Civic Platform list.

See also
Members of Polish Sejm 2005-2007

External links
Jerzy Kozdroń - parliamentary page - includes declarations of interest, voting record, and transcripts of speeches.

Members of the Polish Sejm 2005–2007
Civic Platform politicians
1950 births
Living people
Members of the Polish Sejm 2007–2011
Members of the Polish Sejm 2011–2015
Nicolaus Copernicus University in Toruń alumni